From 1946 through 1993, thirteen countries used ocean disposal or ocean dumping as a method to dispose of nuclear/radioactive waste with an approximation of 200,000 tons sourcing mainly from the medical, research and nuclear industry.

The waste materials included both liquids and solids housed in various containers, as well as reactor vessels, with and without spent or damaged nuclear fuel. Since 1993, ocean disposal has been banned by international treaties. (London Convention (1972), Basel Convention, MARPOL 73/78). There has only been the disposal of low level radioactive waste (LLW) thus far in terms of ocean dumping as high level waste has been strictly prohibited.

"Ocean floor disposal" (or sub-seabed disposal)—a more deliberate method of delivering radioactive waste to the ocean floor and depositing it into the seabed—was studied by the United Kingdom and Sweden, but never implemented.

History 
Data are from IAEA-TECDOC-1105, pages 3–4.
 1946 First dumping operation at Northeast Pacific Ocean (about 80 km off the coast of California)
 1957 First IAEA Advisory Group Meeting on Radioactive Waste Disposal into the Sea
 1958 First United Nations Conference on the Law of the Sea (UNCLOS I)
 1964  On the 21 April, a satellite failed carrying a SNAP-9A radiothermal generator. 17,000 Ci (630 TBq) plutonium metal fuel burned up.
 1972 Adoption of the Convention on the Prevention of Marine Pollution by Dumping of Wastes and Other Matter (London Convention 1972)
 1975 The London Convention 1972 entered into force (Prohibition of dumping of high level radioactive waste.)
 1978 On the 24 January a satellite named Kosmos 954 failed. It was powered by a liquid sodium–potassium thermionic converter driven by a nuclear reactor containing around 50 kilograms (110 lb) of uranium-235.
 1983 Moratorium on low-level waste dumping
 1988 Assessing the Impact of Deep Sea Disposal of Low-level Radioactive Waste on Living Marine Resources. IAEA Technical Reports Series No. 288
 1990 Estimation of Radiation Risks at Low Dose. IAEA-TECDOC-557
 1993 Russia reported the dumping of high level nuclear waste including spent fuel by former USSR.
 1994 (February 20) Total prohibition of disposal at sea came into force

1946–1993 
Data are from IAEA-TECDOC-1105. Summary of pages 27–120:

Disposal projects attempted to locate ideal dumping sites based on depth, stability and currents, and to treat, solidify and contain the waste. However, some dumping only involved diluting the waste with surface water, or used containers that imploded at depth. Even containers that survived the pressure could physically decay over time.

The countries involved – listed in order of total contributions measured in TBq (TBq=1012 becquerel) – were the Soviet Union, the United Kingdom, Switzerland, the United States, Belgium, France, the Netherlands, Japan, Sweden, Russia, New Zealand, Germany, Italy and South Korea. Together, they dumped a total of 85,100 TBq (85.1x1015 Bq) of radioactive waste at over 100 ocean sites, as measured in initial radioactivity at the time of dump.

For comparison:

 Global fallout of nuclear weapon tests – 2,566,087x1015 Bq.
 1986 Chernobyl disaster total release – 12,060x1015 Bq.
 2011 Fukushima Daiichi nuclear disaster, estimated total 340x1015 to 780x1015 Bq, with 80% falling into the Pacific Ocean.
 Fukushima Daiichi nuclear plant cooling water dumped (leaked) to the sea – TEPCO estimate 4.7x1015 Bq, Japanese Nuclear Safety Commission estimate 15x1015 Bq, French Nuclear Safety Committee estimate 27x1015 Bq.
 Naturally occurring Potassium 40 in all oceans – 14,000,000x1015 Bq.
 One container (net 400 kg) of vitrified high-level radioactive waste has an average radioactivity of 4x1015 Bq (Max 45x1015 Bq).

Types of waste and packaging 
Data are from IAEA-TECDOC-1105.

Liquid waste 
 unpackaged and diluted in surface waters
 contained in package but not solidified

Solid waste
 low level waste like resins, filters, material used for decontamination processes, etc., solidified with cement or bitumen and packaged in metal containers
 unpackaged solid waste, mainly large parts of nuclear installations (steam generators, pumps, lids of reactor pressure vessels, etc.)

Reactor vessels
 without nuclear fuel
 containing damaged spent nuclear fuel solidified with polymer agent
 special container with damaged spent nuclear fuel (icebreaker Lenin by the former Soviet Union)

Dump sites 
Data are from IAEA-TECDOC-1105. There are three dump sites in the Pacific Ocean.

Arctic
Mainly at the east coast of Novaya Zemlya at Kara Sea and relatively small proportion at Barents Sea by the Soviet Union. Dumped at 20 sites from 1959 to 1992, total of 222,000 m3 including reactors and spent fuel.

North Atlantic 
Dumping occurred from 1948 to 1982.  The UK accounts for 78% of dumping in the Atlantic (35,088 TBq), followed by Switzerland (4,419 TBq), the United States (2,924 TBq) and Belgium (2,120 TBq). Sunken Soviet nuclear submarines are not included; see List of sunken nuclear submarines

There were 137,000 tonnes dumped by eight European countries. The United States reported neither tonnage nor volume for 34,282 containers.

Pacific Ocean
The Soviet Union 874 TBq, US 554 TBq, Japan 606.2 Tonnes, New Zealand 1+ TBq. 751,000 m3 was dumped by Japan and the Soviet Union. The United States reported neither tonnage nor volume of 56,261 containers.

Dumping of contaminated water at the 2011 Fukushima nuclear accident (estimate 4,700–27,000 TBq) is not included.

Sea of Japan 
The Soviet Union dumped 749 TBq.  Japan dumped 15.1 TBq south of main island. South Korea dumped 45 tonnes (unknown radioactivity value).

Environmental impact 
Data are from IAEA-TECDOC-1105.

Arctic Ocean  

Joint Russian-Norwegian expeditions (1992–94) collected samples from four dump sites. At immediate vicinity of waste containers, elevated levels of radionuclide were found, but had not contaminated the surrounding area.

North-East Atlantic Ocean 

Dumping was undertaken by UK, Switzerland, Belgium, France, the Netherlands, Sweden, Germany and Italy.
IAEA had been studying since 1977. The report of 1996, by CRESP suggests measurable leakages of radioactive material, and, concluded that environmental impact is negligible.

North-East Pacific Ocean, North-West Atlantic Ocean dump sites of USA

These sites are monitored by the United States Environmental Protection Agency and US National Oceanic and Atmospheric Administration. So far, no excess level of radionuclides was found in samples (sea water, sediments) collected in the area, except the sample taken at a location close to disposed packages that contained elevated levels of isotopes of caesium and plutonium.

North-West Pacific Ocean dump sites of the Soviet Union, Japan, Russia, and Korea

The joint Japanese-Korean-Russian expedition (1994–95) concluded that contamination resulted mainly from global fallout. The USSR dumped waste in the Sea of Japan. Japan dumped waste south of the main island.

Policies 
The first conversations surrounding dumping radioactive waste into the ocean began in 1958 at the United Nations Law of the Sea Conference (UNCLOS). The conference resulted in an agreement that all states should actively try to prevent radioactive waste pollution in the sea and follow any international guidelines regarding the issue. The UNCLOS also instigated research into the issues radioactive waste dumping caused.

However, by the late 1960s to early 1970s, millions of tons of waste were still being dumped into the ocean annually. By this time, governments began to realize the severe impacts of marine pollution, which led to one of the first international policies regarding ocean dumping in 1972 – the London Convention. The London Convention’s main goals were to effectively control sources of marine pollution and take the proper steps to prevent it from happening, mainly accomplishing this by banning specific substances from being dumped in the ocean. The most recent version of the London Convention now bans all materials from marine dumping, except a thoroughly researched list of certain wastes. It also prohibits waste from being exported to other countries for disposal, as well as incinerating waste in the ocean. While smaller organizations like the Nuclear Energy Agency of the European Organization for Economic Cooperation and Development have produced similar regulations, the London Convention remains the central international figure of radioactive waste policies.

Although there are many existing regulations that ban ocean dumping, it is still a prevalent issue. Different countries enforce the ban on radioactive waste dumping on different levels, resulting in an inconsistent implementation of the agreed upon policies. Because of these discrepancies, it is hard to judge the effectiveness of international regulations like the London Convention.

See also
Horizontal drillhole disposal
Ocean floor disposal
 Deep borehole disposal
 Yucca Mountain nuclear waste repository
 Waste Isolation Pilot Plant
 Grigory Pasko
 Nuclear fuel cycle
 Radioactive waste
 
 Decommissioning of Russian nuclear-powered vessels

References

Radioactive waste repositories
Hazardous waste
Environmental impact of nuclear power
Ocean pollution